The Art of Charlie Chan Hock Chye is a graphic novel by Sonny Liew published in 2015 by Epigram Books and 2016 by Pantheon Books. It tells the story of Charlie Chan Hock Chye, a fictional cartoonist, from his early days in colonial life to the present day, while showcasing extracts of his comics depicting allegories of political situations of the time. The comic features a mixture of black and white sketches depicting Singapore's early history contrasted with color comics depicting the present, with several comics within the novel telling their own story. The book was awarded the Singapore Literature Prize following its publication in 2016. The book soon gained widespread critical acclaim internationally and was given several awards, including three Eisner Awards in 2017.

Plot summary
The novel initially starts with an introduction of the titular character Charlie Chan Hock Chye as an old man talking to an interviewer before transitioning to his childhood, where he is seen working in his family's shop in post-war Singapore. It then shows Charlie Chan's first comic "Ah Huat's Giant Robot" which features a robot that can only understand Chinese. The book then cuts between the life of Charlie and excerpts from his comics, explaining that he was educated in an English school through the generosity of one of his family's shops' customers. This pattern of cuts between comics and his life continues throughout the rest of the novel as the comic steadily changes from one about a Giant Robot to an allegory for Singapore's quest for independence from British Colonial rule, featuring animals and sci-fi epics allegorizing Singapore as a city under the rule of aliens with Lee Kuan Yew as a lawyer who speaks the language of the aliens. Charlie begins a partnership with a fellow young comic artist who eventually breaks up with him due to financial stress, after 8 years and numerous comics, including a superhero tale about a night soil man bitten by a cockroach and becoming Roachman, a parody of Spider-Man.

Nearing the end, a comic depicting the actions the Singapore government undertook to take control of the press is depicted via a comic depicting Singapore as Sinkapor Inks, a company with Lee Kuan Yew as a ruthless boss with the press as a company newsletter. Finally, a what-if section depicts Singapore if the Barisan Sosialis had won, ending in an alternate version of Singapore with a similar economic development as that of the present.

Controversy
A grant of S$8,000 was initially given for the creation of the novel by the National Arts Council, but was revoked on 29 May 2015, ahead of the 30 May official book launch at Kinokuniya Singapore Bookstore due to "sensitive content" which sparked controversy.

A spokesperson for the NAC responded in a newspaper forum that the graphic novel "potentially undermines the authority of legitimacy  of the Government and its public institutions and thus breaches our funding guidelines". Epigram Books founder Edmund Wee had returned the S$6,400 and printed stickers to cover up the National Arts Council logo in the printed books.

The withdrawal of the government grant, however, created much publicity for the book and the 1,000 initial prints of the book sold out quickly upon its launch. The second print of books without the NAC logo was back in bookstores from 19 June 2015 onwards.

International release
The book was published by American publisher Pantheon Books in March 2016 and released internationally. The book had appeared on international bestseller lists compiled by Amazon.com and The New York Times. Besides winning the Singapore Literature Prize in 2016, it also won the Book of the Year accolade at the Singapore Book Awards in 2016. It was also awarded the Pingprisen for Best International Comic in 2017.
In 21 July 2017, Sonny Liew, the author of the book, won three Eisner Awards for Best Writer/Artist, Best Publication Design and Best U.S. Edition of International Material—Asia in the 29th annual Will Eisner Comic Industry Awards held at the Comic-Con International, San Diego, United States. He was also nominated for three other Eisner Awards for Best Letterer, Best Colorist, and Best Graphic Album—New.

Awards
Winner of the Singapore Literature Prize 2016
New York Times bestseller
Economist Book of the Year 2016
NPR Graphic Novel Pick for 2016
Washington Post Best Graphic Novel of 2016
New York Post Best Books of 2016
Publishers Weekly Best Book of 2016
South China Morning Post Top 10 Asian books of 2016
The A.V. Club Best Comics of 2016
Comic Book Resources Top 100 Comics of 2016
Mental Floss Most Interesting Graphic Novel of 2016
2017 Pingprisen Bedste Internationale Tegneserte
2017 Eisner Award Winner for Best Writer/Artist 
2017 Eisner Award Winner for Best Publication Design
2017 Eisner Award Winner for Best U.S. Edition of International Material—Asia

References

2016 graphic novels
Singaporean fiction
Singaporean comics titles
Comics about comics
Metafictional comics
Pantheon Books graphic novels